Saint-Père River is a tributary of the east bank of the Wetetnagami River flowing into Senneterre, in the RCM of La Vallée-de-l'Or Regional County Municipality, in the administrative region of Abitibi-Témiscamingue, in Quebec, in Canada.

This river successively crosses the townships of Saint-Père and Moquin. The surface of the Saint-Père River is generally frozen from early December to late April. Forestry is the main economic activity of the sector; recreational tourism activities, second.

The Saint-Père River valley is served by the forest road (East-West direction) passing north of Wetetnagami Lake] and another on the South side passing through the Wetetnagami Lake Biodiversity Reserve.

Geography

Toponymy 
At various times in history, this territory has been occupied by the Attikameks, the Algonquin and the Cree.

The toponym "Rivière Saint-Père" was officialized on December 5, 1968, at the Commission de toponymie du Québec, when it was created.

See also

References

External links 

Rivers of Abitibi-Témiscamingue